Caravan of Death is a 1991 Soviet action film directed by Ivan Solovov.

Plot 
A group of Afghan Mujahideen are planning a diversion. They have in their hands two girls whom they force to be conductors. They destroy the Russian border detachment. Only Ensign Maryin survived. He alone has to prevent diversion.

Cast 
 Aleksandr Pankratov-Chyorny as Ivan Maryin
 Boris Khmelnitsky as Pin
 Yelena Kondulainen as Oksana
 Viktor Pavlov as Andrey Nikolayevich Sablin
 Vladimir Treshchalov as Petr Yefimovich
 Dzhamilya Agamuradova as Dzhamilya
 Mulkoman Orazov as Kamal Tatabekov
 Vladimir Episkoposyan as Ali
 Vyacheslav Ilin as Pavel Pechyonkin (as V. Ilin)

References

External links 
 

1991 films
1990s Russian-language films
Soviet action films
1991 action films